Jesse Vandenbulcke (born 17 January 1996) is a Belgian professional racing cyclist, who currently rides for UCI Women's Continental Team .

Major results
2019
 1st  Road race, National Road Championships

See also
 List of 2015 UCI Women's Teams and riders

References

External links
 

1996 births
Living people
Belgian female cyclists
Place of birth missing (living people)
People from Wervik
Cyclists from West Flanders
21st-century Belgian women